Margaret "Mag" Ruffman (born 28 February 1957) is a Canadian comedian, actress and television host.

She has played roles in films such as Anne of Green Gables and Anne of Avonlea and TV series Road to Avonlea. She was reunited with Sarah Polley on the set of the Netflix show Alias Grace in 2017 when she played Diane.

Mag also creates and performs in the theatre. She created and performed as Ms. Eleanor Crumpacker in Dufferin Museum's 1919 Prohibition Halloween Dinner Theatre in 2019. Mag also wrote and performed in a one-woman show entitled Self-Help Cabaret on 19 January, 2020.

In addition to her acting, Ruffman works on home improvement, hosting shows for W Network, Canada's women's network. She hosted A Repair to Remember in 1999 and 2000. In 2000, she launched a second series, Anything I Can Do, a workshop show. Ruffman writes a weekly home improvement column, ToolGirl, for the Toronto Star. She published a collection of her ToolGirl columns as a book, How Hard Can It Be?, in 2003.

Filmography

Film

Television

Writer & director

References

External links 

 Mag Ruffman page at HomeEnvy.com
 Mag's ToolGirl website
 

1957 births
Living people
Canadian television actresses
Canadian voice actresses
Canadian columnists
Canadian television hosts
People from Richmond Hill, Ontario
Actresses from Ontario
Canadian women columnists
Canadian women television hosts